Bruce Winter may refer to:
 Bruce W. Winter (born 1939), New Testament scholar
 Bruce Winter (footballer) (born 1953), Australian rules footballer